Hamulinidae is an extinct ammonoid cephalopod family belonging to the order Ammonitida. These cephalopod were fast-moving nektonic carnivores. They lived during the Lower Cretaceous period (Lower Barremian - Upper Barremian).

Description 

The long main shaft is followed by a hook and a shorter, close, parallel or slightly divergent final shaft. The ammonitic suture is with a subtrifid L.  The U is usually reduced or indifferentiated in adults.

Genera
 Anahamulina
 Hamulina

Notes

References

 

Cretaceous ammonites
Ammonitida families
Ancyloceratoidea